Embarrassing Moments is a 1934 American comedy film directed by Edward Laemmle and written by Charles Logue, Dickson Morgan and Gladys Buchanan Unger. The film stars Chester Morris, Marian Nixon, Walter Woolf King, Alan Mowbray, George E. Stone and John Wray. The film was released on September 1, 1934, by Universal Pictures.

Plot
Complications arising out of an attempt to cure a practical joker by his own methods.

Cast 
Chester Morris as Jerry Randolph
Marian Nixon as Jane
Walter Woolf King as Paul
Alan Mowbray as Aheam
George E. Stone as Louie
John Wray as Slug
Henry Armetta as Morganza
Huntley Gordon as Runyon
Gay Seabrook as Miss Dodd
Herman Bing as Bartender
Virginia Sale as Mother
Jane Darwell as Mrs. Stuckelberger
Charles C. Wilson as Attorney
Christian J. Frank as Man
Carl Miller as Man
Lois January as Tipsy Girl

References

External links 
 

1934 films
1930s English-language films
American comedy films
1934 comedy films
Universal Pictures films
Films directed by Edward Laemmle
American black-and-white films
Films scored by Edward Ward (composer)
1930s American films